The Dobberworth or Dubberworth is one of the largest prehistoric tumuli (Hügelgrab) in northern Germany, located on the isle of Rügen near Sagard. Archaeologists were not yet able to date the tumulus precisely, but assume it was used during the Bronze Age. The etymology of the name is also uncertain, "-worth" is linked to an old designation for an "elevated estate" ("Worte", "Wurt").

According to local legends, the Dubberworth was made by a giant who intended to fill a narrow ford linking two nearby Bodden and lost the clay on their way. In one legend, the giant was a female on her way to exact revenge on a prince of Rügen who did not love her back, in another legend it was male giant Scharmak on his way to his girl-friend. A further legend tells about dwarven dwellers and large amounts of gold inside the hill.

References

See also
Early history of Pomerania

Prehistoric sites in Germany
Pomerania
Rügen